Gloucester City Basketball Club are a professional basketball club based in Gloucester, England.

History
In June 2021, Alex Petheram Co-Chairman of Gloucester City A.F.C. announced the launch of professional basketball in Gloucester along with the appointment of Jay Marriott as CEO and coach.

As part of this, the Kings (men) and Queens (women) were announced as the city's new professional basketball teams. In the same month, the Queens were announced to be making their debut in the WBBL in the 2021–22 season, with the basketball model under the ownership of Soldi Tree 1989 Ltd.

Women's team
The Queens competed in the 2021–22 season of the Women's British Basketball League (WBBL), the highest division of women's basketball competition in the United Kingdom. The team withdrew shortly before the commencement of the 2022-23 season.

Season-by-season records

References

Women's basketball teams in England
2021 establishments in England
Women's British Basketball League teams
Basketball teams established in 2021
Sport in Gloucester